Go Station may refer to:

 The GoStation, an American rock band
 Any station in the GO Transit system, in the Greater Toronto and Hamilton Area, Ontario, Canada